Richard Bagozzi is an American marketing theorist, consumer psychologist, and the Dwight F. Benton Professor of Behavioral Science in Management at Ross School of Business, University of Michigan. He is one of the most cited scholars in Marketing and among the field's most prominent theorists and empirical researchers. He has been ranked among The World's Most Influential Scientific Minds in 2014 by Thomson Reuters. He is an inaugural fellow of the American Marketing Association.

Books 
 1980, Causal Models in Marketing, New York: Wiley.
 1986, Principles of Marketing Management, Chicago,IL: Science Research Associates.

Awards
 AMA/McGraw-Hill/Irwin Distinguished Marketing Educator Award 
 Fellow of the American Marketing Association
 Paul D. Converse Award, 1992.
Wroe Alderson Distinguished Lecturer, 2006–07.
 Ivy College of Business Marketing Colloquium Distinguished Speaker, Iowa State University, 2019.

References

External links 
 Richard Bagozzi Faculty Page, University of Michigan

Living people
American business theorists
Marketing people
Marketing theorists
University of Michigan faculty
Fellows of the American Marketing Association
Year of birth missing (living people)